A Gigli saw is a flexible wire saw used by surgeons for bone cutting. A Gigli saw is used mainly for amputation, where the bones have to be smoothly cut at the level of amputation.

The saw was invented by Italian obstetrician Leonardo Gigli to simplify the performance of a lateral pubiotomy in obstructed labour.

See also
Instruments used in general surgery

References

Orthopaedic instruments
Saws
Italian inventions